Badlands: A Tribute to Bruce Springsteen's Nebraska is a tribute album containing songs by artists inspired and influenced by Bruce Springsteen's 1982 album Nebraska. It was released by Sub Pop Records in November 2000.

A portion of the worldwide sales of this record has been donated to the Nobel Prize-winning organization Médecins Sans Frontières.
 
The album received a favorable review from PopMatters, which said it "succeeds because the original work was so strong. The people in these songs live. They walk our streets, put gas in our car, and cry alone at night. The artists that allow the voices of the characters to dominant the song, instead of overshadowing with their own persona, come out the best." AllMusic said "This is more successful than most tribute albums ... though like virtually all tribute albums, it's uneven."

Track listing

References

2000 compilation albums
Sub Pop compilation albums
Folk compilation albums
Rock compilation albums
Bruce Springsteen tribute albums